Heart of the Casbah (French: Au coeur de la Casbah) is a 1952 French drama film directed by Pierre Cardinal and starring Viviane Romance, Claude Laydu and Peter van Eyck.

It was shot at the Billancourt Studios in Paris and on location in French Algeria, particularly around the Casbah of Algiers. The film's sets were designed by the art directors Roland Berthon and Antoine Malliarakis.

Cast
 Viviane Romance as Maria Pilar
 Claude Laydu as Michel
 Peter van Eyck as Jo
 Philippe Richard as Gros Polo
 Sylvie Pelayo as Sylvie
 Roger Gaillard as Le père de Michel
 Simone Moussia as Yasmine

References

Bibliography 
 Rège, Philippe. Encyclopedia of French Film Directors, Volume 1. Scarecrow Press, 2009.

External links 
 

1952 films
French drama films
1952 drama films
1950s French-language films
Films directed by Pierre Cardinal
Films shot in Algeria
Films set in Algiers
Films shot at Billancourt Studios
1950s French films